Paleontography (from Ancient Greek παλαιός “old”, ὤν "being", γραφή "I write") is the formal description of fossil remains. It is a subdiscipline of paleontology. The term has been in use in this sense for more than a hundred and fifty years, for example by the Palaeontographical Society. A paleontographer (or palaeontographer) is anyone who works in the field.

The term has more recently been adopted for one who uses medical imaging technology to scan fossils; mainly using CT scanning or any non-invasive scanning technology. The use of medical CT scanning technology allows scientists to use a non-invasive method to examine fossils or rock specimens without physically removing material, called preparation. Inventor/Software engineer Lee Schiel of Early Response Imaging and Doctors Michael Smith and John Nesson of Arcadia Methodist Hospital were the first pioneers of this field in the late 1990s.

References

Subfields of paleontology